is a village located in Tokachi Subprefecture, Hokkaido, Japan.

As of September 2016, the village has an estimated population of 3,980. The total area is 292.69 km2.

Mascot

He is a baby chick. His face looks like an egg, his eyes are like beans, and his shoes are made of potatoes (these agricultural products are products of the town). Although he usually wears a top hat and carries a lily of the valley, he can change into other clothes. His favorite hobbies are climbing mountains, farming, judo and attending festivals. He was unveiled in March 1991.

Notable people from Nakasatsunai
Shiho Ishizawa, speed skater
Misaki Oshigiri, speed skater

References

External links

Official Website 

Villages in Hokkaido